Danil Yuryevich Massurenko (born 22 May 1999) is a Russian football player. He plays for FC Khimki-M.

Club career
He made his debut in the Russian Football National League for FC Khimki on 10 March 2018 in a game against FC Shinnik Yaroslavl.

References

External links
 Profile by Russian Football National League

1999 births
Living people
Russian people of Ukrainian descent
Russian footballers
FC Khimki players
Association football forwards